Howells is a village in Colfax County, Nebraska, United States. The population was 561 at the 2010 census.

History
Howells was platted in 1886 when the Fremont, Elkhorn and Missouri Valley Railroad was extended to that point. It was named for James Smith Howell, a local resident. The Howells post office, established in 1886, was spelled as Howell (without the S) until 1937.

Geography
Howells is located at  (41.724237, -97.004976).

Howells is in northern Colfax County in east-central Nebraska, three miles east of the junction of highways 15 and 91.

Demographics

2010 census
As of the census of 2010, there were 561 people, 244 households, and 154 families residing in the village. The racial makeup of the village was 97.0% White, 0.5% Native American, 0.4% Asian, 0.4% Pacific Islander, 0.2% from other races, and 1.6% from two or more races. Hispanic or Latino of any race were 2.0% of the population.

There were 244 households, of which 27.5% had children under the age of 18 living with them, 55.3% were married couples living together, 4.1% had a female householder with no husband present, 3.7% had a male householder with no wife present, and 36.9% were non-families. 34.4% of all households were made up of individuals, and 18.5% had someone living alone who was 65 years of age or older. The average household size was 2.30 and the average family size was 2.97.

The median age in the village was 44.9 years. 23.9% of residents were under the age of 18; 5.4% were between the ages of 18 and 24; 21% were from 25 to 44; 25.7% were from 45 to 64; and 24.1% were 65 years of age or older. The gender makeup of the village was 49.2% male and 50.8% female.

2000 census
As of the census of 2000, there were 632 people, 281 households, and 182 families residing in the village. The population density was 1,126.8 people per square mile (435.7/km). There were 307 housing units at an average density of 547.3 per square mile (211.7/km). The racial makeup of the village was 97.78% White, 0.16% Native American, 0.47% Asian, 0.79% from other races, and 0.79% from two or more races. Hispanic or Latino of any race were 1.27% of the population.

There were 281 households, out of which 27.4% had children under the age of 18 living with them, 56.2% were married couples living together, 6.0% had a female householder with no husband present, and 34.9% were non-families. 33.1% of all households were made up of individuals, and 23.5% had someone living alone who was 65 years of age or older. The average household size was 2.25 and the average family size was 2.87.

In the village, the population was spread out, with 25.0% under the age of 18, 3.5% from 18 to 24, 24.2% from 25 to 44, 20.3% from 45 to 64, and 27.1% who were 6 years of age or older. The median age was 43 years. For every 100 females, there were 84.8 males. For every 100 females age 18 and over, there were 82.3 males.

As of 2000 the median income for a household in the village was $33,750, and the median income for a family was $40,000. Males had a median income of $25,417 versus $20,000 for females. The per capita income for the village was $17,433. About 1.6% of families and 6.0% of the population were below the poverty line, including 4.0% of those under age 18 and 11.4% of those age 65 or over.

Economy
Major economic activities in the Howells area include crop production, cattle- and hog feeding, and wholesale and retail sales.

Notable person
 Brad Vering, Olympic wrestler

References

External links
 Village of Howells 
 City-Data Comprehensive Statistical Data and more about Howells

Villages in Colfax County, Nebraska
Villages in Nebraska